The Bay River, also known as the Sapang River or the San Nicolas River, is a river system in Bay, Laguna.  It is one of 21 major tributaries of Laguna de Bay and is the more southern of two small rivers that hem the town proper of Bay.

The other is the Calo River, another Laguna de Bay tributary, to the north. In geographical terms, these two rivers created the main area of the town of Bay by leaving many centuries' worth of alluvial deposits in the lower section of the plain close to Laguna de Bay.

Over time, that plain was selected by the earliest settlers of Bay as the site of their community because the access to the lake meant easy transportation and ready access to a water source.

The downside to this choice of location was regular flooding. Residents still recall that when the two rivers overflowed their banks, the poblacion and six other barangays would be flooded.  However, this rarely happens today because an irrigation system consisting of canals and ditches which bring water from these rivers into the ricefields have reduced the force of the waters.

The Bay River forms Bay's boundary with Calauan, Laguna. A third river on the opposite side of the town, the Maitem River, forms Bay's boundary with Los Baños, Laguna.

See also
 Laguna de Bay
 Laguna Lake Development Authority

References 
Jocano, F. Landa (1973). Folk Medicine in a Philippine Community. Quezon City: Punlad Research House, Inc.. .
Scott, William Henry (1994). Barangay: Sixteenth Century Philippine Culture and Society. Quezon City: Ateneo de Manila University Press. .

External links

Rivers of the Philippines
Tributaries of Laguna de Bay